The Communauté de communes de la Brie Boisée is a former communauté de communes in the Seine-et-Marne département and in the Île-de-France région of France. It was created in December 1994. It was merged into the new Communauté de communes du Val Briard in January 2017.

Composition 
The Communauté de communes comprised the following communes:
Favières
Ferrières-en-Brie
Pontcarré
Villeneuve-le-Comte
Villeneuve-Saint-Denis

See also
Communes of the Seine-et-Marne department

References

Brie Boisee